Gesa A. Weyhenmeyer (born 1969) is a Swedish limnologist who is working as a professor and distinguished teacher at Uppsala University in Sweden. She is a member of the Royal Swedish Academy of Sciences, and known for her research on understanding lake ecosystems in a changing global environment. Her research requires a holistic and global perspective, for which she collaborates with members of the Global Lake Ecological Observatory Network (GLEON). In addition to GLEON, Weyhenmeyer is strongly engaged in the Intergovernmental Panel on Climate Change (IPCC), both as reviewer and contributing author

Weyhenmeyer communicates research to the general public. In 2016, she performed a citizen scientist project with the involvement of nearly 3,500 schoolchildren. The results of the project led to a new climate change related scientific discovery which was recognized by a large variety of national and international media In December 2020, Weyhenmeyer and climate scientist Will Steffen initiated an open letter in the Guardian calling for human civilization to prepare for the possibility of collapse within the 21st century in light of the impending failure to implement timely climate action and the resulting climate catastrophe.

References

External links 
 

1969 births
Living people
Members of the Royal Swedish Academy of Sciences
Swedish women scientists
21st-century Swedish scientists
21st-century women scientists
Swedish limnologists
Women limnologists
Academic staff of Uppsala University